Lowton is a village within the Metropolitan Borough of Wigan, in Greater Manchester, England. The settlement lies across the A580 East Lancashire Road.

Within the boundaries of the historic county of Lancashire, Lowton's history is closely connected with Byrom Manor, the ancestral home of the Byroms, a family which included poet John Byrom; the inventor of a system of shorthand. During the Industrial Revolution Lowton was associated with coal mining and manufacturing, given its proximity to several nearby collieries and factories.

At the 2011 census, the population of Lowton was split between two wards, Lowton East, and Golborne and Lowton West. The latter partially counted the entire population of Golborne, and partially the population of Lowton's western half, with the boundary between them roughly being at Scott Road to the north and Windsor Road to the south.

History
Lowton has an unclear toponymy: it is from Old English tun "farm, village" with an uncertain first element (The first element is from lhe old English for high point IE Wornoth Low near Stockport is the highest hill in the area, and Lowton is the highest point locally.) A record of the name as Liewetune in 1176 suggests Old English hleowe "lee", although this is not a certain etymology.

Lowton was one of the berewicks of the Royal Manor of Newton, later being one of the members of the Barony of Makerfield.
Byrom Manor, later to feature the ancestral home of the poet John Byrom and was constructed during the 18th century, is recorded as early as 1212,
where the family prospered for centuries. Byrom Hall at one time featured a moat.

The Hare and Hounds public house, built in the 17th century, was once used as a place to hold trials of local criminals, including murders. The Lowton stocks can still be found today nearby at St Luke’s Parish Church and are Grade II listed.

The former Lowton railway station was used as a resting point for the royal train. Lowton had a second station – Lowton St Mary's – which closed in 1964.

Lowton had a toffee factory, along with other sites of heavy industry. Many of these factories have now closed and have been replaced with light industry.

Lowton's Sandy Lane is reputedly haunted by the ghost of Joshua Rigby, a local farmer who died in 1883.

Governance and politics
Between 1894 and 1974, Lowton was part of the Golborne Urban District, in the administrative county of Lancashire. In 1974 as part of the local government reorganisation enacted in the Local Government Act 1972 it became part of Greater Manchester with the boundary at Newton-le-Willows marking the edge of the new county of Merseyside.

Lowton is within the constituency of Leigh and is represented in parliament by the Conservative MP James Grundy.

Locally, the area is represented on Wigan Council by three Conservative Party members - Marie Cooper (who replaced James Grundy following his election as Member of Parliament), Noel Houlton and Kathleen Houlton.

Transport
Situated on the A580 East Lancashire Road, the village has direct access to the cities of Manchester to the east and Liverpool to the west.  From this road, the M6 motorway runs north and south, and the M60 connects with the M62 across the Pennines. Also, the M61 can be reached via the A579. The nearest railway station is Newton-le-Willows on the Chester to Manchester Line and Liverpool to Manchester Line. Public transport in Lowton is co-ordinated by Transport for Greater Manchester and is served by buses to Manchester, Wigan, Leigh, Newton-le-Willows and St Helens. Buses: 34 Bryn/Leigh-Manchester (Stagecoach Manchester), 34 St Helens-Leigh (Arriva Merseyside), 10 Leigh-Wigan (Stagecoach Manchester).

Environment
To the south of Lowton is Highfield Moss, part of which has been designated a Site of Special Scientific Interest. The  site was designated in 1986 for its biological interest. It is predominantly notable as a mire community and it is the best example in Greater Manchester.

Education
 Lowton Church of England High School
 Lowton Primary School
 Lowton St. Marys Primary School (Church of England)
 Lowton West Primary School
 St. Catherine of Siena Catholic Primary School
 St. Lukes Church of England Primary School

Religion
In 1635 the Puritan clergyman, Richard Mather, and his family left for New England as a result of religious intolerance.

Lowton's churches include the two Church of England churches of St Mary's and St Luke's and Lowton Independent Methodist, a member of the Independent Methodist Connexion. and Lowton Community Church. Lane Head Methodist church closed in 2010. The Roman Catholic church of St Catherine of Siena closed in 2011 after a safety inspection revealed problems with the electrical system, and the building was demolished in 2017.

The churches in Lowton organise some joint activities including ecumenical services. Their charity work has included the Lowton Churches Romania Appeal, formed after the collapse of the Communist regime in Romania in 1990. It supported an orphanage in Lugoj but its remit has since expanded to include several projects in the country.

St Luke's

A date of 1732 on the church door suggests that the building was completed that year. The Chapel was consecrated on 18 October 1733, St Luke's Day, by the Bishop of Chester. The chapel and chapel yard were built on land given by Hugh Stirrup, a yeoman of Lowton. Although the Deed of Consecration allowed for all the regular church services and sacraments, the chapel was not yet a Parish Church and thus no burials were permitted. The parish registers were stored at Winwick.

Today many of the chapel pews still bear metal plates showing the names of their original owners. The oldest, pew No. 1, has a plate for Edward Byrom dated 1732. Other plates bear the surnames Green, Kenyon, Leigh, Lowe, Mather, Pierpoint, Tyler, and Worsley.

Sport and organisations
Lowton is the location for Golborne Sports and Social Club which participates in local football, hockey, bowls and cricket leagues. Other nearby sports teams include Golborne Parkside RLFC, Leigh RUFC and Leigh United FC.

Media

Lowton falls inside the circulation areas of these newspapers and websites:
 Wigan Evening Post
 Wigan Reporter
 Leigh Reporter
 Leigh Journal
 Manchester Evening News

Notable people
 Clayton Blackmore, former Wales and Manchester United footballer, used to live in Lowton.
 John Byrom, an English poet, at times lived at Byrom Hall, Slag Lane.
 Jon Clarke, a former rugby league player, grew up in Lowton.
 James Grundy, the current MP for Leigh, has lived on a farm in Lowton since birth.
 Richard Mather, who became an American Congregational clergyman, was born in Lowton.
 Bert Worsley Farmer and Historian
 Katie White, singer with pop group The Ting Tings, was brought up on a farm in Slag Lane, Lowton.

See also

References

Notes

Further reading

External links

 GB7JL Amateur radio repeater
 A Piece of Lowton History
 Community info
 Links to many Lowton interest websites
 1st Lowton St Marys Scout Group
 Lowton Independent Methodist Church

Areas of Greater Manchester
Geography of the Metropolitan Borough of Wigan